Mushan may refer to:
 Mushan, Albania
 Mushan, Zhejiang (牟山镇), town in Yuyao, Zhejiang, China
 Mushan, Iran
 Mushan, Afghanistan